Shea Keegan McClellin (born August 1, 1989) is a former American football outside linebacker. He played college football at Boise State. He was drafted by the Chicago Bears with the 19th overall pick in the 2012 NFL Draft.

Early life
McClellin was born on August 1, 1989, in Caldwell, Idaho, and lived in Marsing. McClellin was adopted by his maternal grandparents, Terry and Jerry McClellin, when he was 18 months old. He grew up on a farm in Caldwell, where he helped his parents raise various farm animals and animals in distress.

McClellin went to Marsing High School, where he was a letterman in football, basketball, and baseball. As a linebacker, he finished with 126 tackles, six interceptions and seven defensive touchdowns. McClellin also played running back, running for 1,893 yards and 22 touchdowns. In his junior year, he was named to the second-team all-conference team after rushing for 998 yards and leading his team in touchdowns with 17. In his senior year, he was named Western Idaho Conference Offensive Player of Year and Defensive Player of Year, as well as first-team all-state. In basketball, he averaged 16.7 points and 11.6 rebounds per game, and in baseball he had a .453 batting average, with 21 RBI and 10 stolen bases as a junior.

College career
McClellin attended Boise State University from 2008 to 2011. During his career he had 130 tackles, 20.5 sacks, four interceptions and two touchdowns.

After he was drafted, a dispute arose about his concussion history during his time with the Broncos, triggered by an NFL Network report claiming that he had three concussions during his college career and McClellin claiming that he only had one. When asked about this, McClellin stated that he had concussion-like symptoms, rather than a concussion.

In his second freshman year, after redshirting his first, McClellin played in 10 games before injuring his leg against Idaho. During his first year, he recorded 14 tackles and 3 forced fumbles. McClellin recorded a sack and forced a fumble against Hawaii, as well as blocking a field goal attempt against Oregon. The Broncos would finish undefeated, but would lose to TCU in the 2008 Poinsettia Bowl.
He played in all 13 games for the Broncos, including starts in the final 11 in 2009. McClellin recorded 36 tackles, six tackles-for-loss and three sacks, as well as recording an interception and two pass break-ups. McClellin recorded at least one tackle in 12 games. His lone interception of the season came against Utah State. Like the year before, the Broncos went undefeated, and ultimately avenged their loss to TCU the year before, this time in the 2010 Fiesta Bowl.

In McClellin's junior year, he recorded 30 tackles on the season, including 13.5 tackles-for-loss – tied for the most on the team – and a team-high 9.5 sacks. He tied his career high with six tackles against Virginia Tech in the team's 2010 season opener. McClellin also forced one fumble and recovered two, one of which was returned for a touchdown against Wyoming, and returned an interception 36 yards for a touchdown against the Toledo Rockets, becoming the first Bronco defensive player to score on a fumble recovery and an interception in the same season since 1999. Boise State would ultimately go to the 2010 Maaco Bowl Las Vegas, and triumph over the Utah Utes.
In his final season, McClellin registered 50 tackles, 7 sacks and 12.5 tackles-for-loss.  He intercepted two passes, one each against Colorado State and San Diego State, as well as having blocked a kick against the Rams. He recorded a career-high eight tackles against UNLV, as well as a career-high 2.5 sacks against Georgia in the season-opener. In his final game of his college career, McClellin recorded 3 tackles for losses in the victory against the Arizona State Sun Devils in the 2011 Maaco Bowl Las Vegas. He completed the season tied for 15th among active players in career sacks (20.5). McClellin eventually participated in the 2012 Senior Bowl.

College statistics

Professional career

2012 NFL Draft

Before the draft, McClellin was projected as a mid-round pick, but after the Combine, McClellin emerged as a first-round draft pick, with mock drafts having him going to a team that runs the 3-4 defense like the Green Bay Packers or the New England Patriots, praising his work ethic and size, but questioned his strength. Chicago Bears general manager Phil Emery stated that he intended on drafting McClellin as an outside linebacker during his time with the Kansas City Chiefs. McClellin later worked out for 11 teams, including the Patriots, Chiefs, Buffalo Bills, Tennessee Titans, Indianapolis Colts and the Cleveland Browns. Analysts believed that he could go to the Bears, Packers, San Diego Chargers, Baltimore Ravens, Houston Texans, Pittsburgh Steelers or the New York Jets.

Ultimately,  he ended up going to the Bears with the 19th pick in the draft. According to the Bears website, NFL analyst Michael Lombardi was the lone analyst to project McClellin going to the Bears. McClellin is the second highest draft pick in Boise State history, behind only Ryan Clady (No. 12 in 2008 by Denver).

Chicago Bears
After getting drafted by Chicago, Emery stated that McClellin would play opposite Julius Peppers at left defensive end, with Chicago Sun-Times writer Sean Jensen saying that McClellin could replace middle-linebacker Brian Urlacher in the event that he leaves the team or retires.
McClellin was signed to a four-year contract on May 11. McClellin made his NFL debut in week one of the preseason against the Denver Broncos, recording three tackles, one sack (on former Bear Caleb Hanie), one tackle-for-loss, and two quarterback hits. McClellin was penalized for a helmet-to-helmet hit on Hanie, setting up a Broncos field goal; even though the kick missed, the Bears would lose 31-3. McClellin recorded his first official sack on Green Bay Packers quarterback Aaron Rodgers, as McClellin recorded 1.5 sacks and four tackles. In the opening minutes of Week 10 against the Houston Texans, McClellin went out with a concussion. McClellin was later injured again when he sprained his MCL against the Minnesota Vikings in Week 14.

In Week 9 of 2013 against the Packers, McClellin recorded three sacks, one of which knocked Rodgers out of the game. McClellin was eventually named the NFC Defensive Player of the Week. However, McClellin suffered a hamstring injury on November 7 during practice, and missed the next two games.
After the 2013 season ended, the Bears announced plans to start McClellin at strong-side linebacker. Chicago Bears senior writer Larry Mayer confirmed the switch on March 24, 2014, and stated that McClellin will switch to #50 in conjunction with the position switch.
On April 29, 2015, the Bears announced that they would not be picking up the fifth-year option of McClellin's contract. McCellin recorded a career-high in tackles in 2015 with 81, one more than he had recorded in his previous three seasons put together.

New England Patriots
On March 16, 2016, McClellin signed a three-year contract with the New England Patriots. The contract had a total value of approximately $9 million with $3.5 million guaranteed. On December 12, 2016, during Monday Night Football, McClellin leaped over Ravens long snapper Morgan Cox to block a Justin Tucker kick, causing the first and only missed field goal of the season for Tucker. On January 1, 2017, he returned a fumble 69 yards in the Week 17 victory over the Miami Dolphins, the longest return in Patriots franchise history. On February 5, 2017, McClellin started at linebacker in the Patriots' Super Bowl LI 34–28 overtime victory over the Atlanta Falcons. During the game, McClellin jumped over the line during an extra point attempt, as he had against the Baltimore Ravens, blocking the kick, but was called for jumping over the center, which on video review seemed to be incorrect, as he appeared to jump over the guard.

On September 4, 2017, McClellin was placed on injured reserve. Without McClellin, the Patriots reached Super Bowl LII, but were defeated by the Philadelphia Eagles.

On March 19, 2018, McClellin was released by the Patriots. On May 29, 2018, Yahoo Sports published an article detailing the possible retirement of McClellin. McClellin decided to retire due to concussion issues.

NFL career statistics

Personal life
In 2012, McClellin became a partner with Allstate and Give Your Sole, and attended the Chicago 13.1 Marathon on June 9 to encourage runners to donate athletic shoes. On June 8, McClellin and the rest of the 2012 Bears draft class planted trees and shrubs at LaFollette Park as part of the team's Save Da Planet program.

References

External links
 
 Boise State Broncos bio
 Chicago Bears bio
 New England Patriots bio

1989 births
Living people
American football defensive ends
American football linebackers
Boise State Broncos football players
Chicago Bears players
New England Patriots players
People from Caldwell, Idaho
Players of American football from Idaho
Brian Piccolo Award winners